Jannie L. Blackwell is the Vice Chair of the Philadelphia Democratic Party and a former member of the Philadelphia City Council. She represented the Third District, which covers much of West Philadelphia and Southwest Philadelphia, including University City, from 1992 to 2020.

Early life and career 
Blackwell grew up in Philadelphia, and worked as a public school teacher before her career in politics.

Political career 
In 1991, Blackwell was elected to represent the Third District on the Philadelphia City Council, succeeding her husband, Lucien Blackwell, who had held the seat for 17 years.

Blackwell opposed certain provisions of pay-to-play and ethics reform bills proposed by then-Councilman Michael Nutter. During a 2005 hearing she stated that minority contractors would be at a disadvantage in bidding for city work if required to disclose campaign contributions. As the lone councilmember to vote against the ethics reform package she noted that placing onerous restrictions on political contributions from firms seeking work would benefit political candidates that are independently wealthy, and that people should be able to contribute to whomever they choose. Blackwell also initially opposed banning smoking in public places in the city.

In 2004, Blackwell introduced two bills that would give City Council the power to designate local historic districts, rather than having the process controlled by the City's Historical Commission. She has challenged the role of the University City District in representing citizens' interests over those of the University of Pennsylvania.

Blackwell was a member of the Philadelphia Housing Authority board. In 2010, Blackwell was the lone member of the PHA board to vote against terminating the contract of PHA Executive Director Carl R. Greene for his alleged sexual harassment of four female subordinates.

Blackwell was Ward Leader of the 46th Ward Democratic Executive Committee.

In the 2019 primary, Blackwell lost the Democratic nomination for her council seat in the Third District to Jamie Gauthier.

Background 
Ms. Blackwell is the widow of former U.S. Representative, State Representative, and City Councilman Lucien Blackwell. Her step-son, Thomas, was a former member of the Pennsylvania House of Representatives.

References 

Living people
Year of birth missing (living people)
Educators from Pennsylvania
American women educators
Philadelphia City Council members
African-American women in politics
Pennsylvania Democrats
Spouses of Pennsylvania politicians
Women city councillors in Pennsylvania
African-American city council members in Pennsylvania
21st-century African-American people
21st-century African-American women